Elena Vladimirovna Kolomina (born 24 January 1981, in Ridder) is a Kazakhstani cross-country skier who has been competing since 1998. She finished fifth in the team sprint at the FIS Nordic World Ski Championships 2007 in Sapporo and had her best individual finish of 21st in the sprint event at the 2001 championships in Lahti.

Kolomina's best individual finish at the Winter Olympics was 19th in the 30 km event at Turin in 2006.

Her best individual finish was second twice at various levels in the sprint event in 2007. Her best individual World Cup finish was seventh in a 15 km event in Canada in 2005.

Cross-country skiing results
All results are sourced from the International Ski Federation (FIS).

Olympic Games

World Championships

World Cup

Individual podiums
1 podium – (1 )

References

External links
 
 
 

1981 births
Living people
People from Ridder, Kazakhstan
Kazakhstani female cross-country skiers
Cross-country skiers at the 2006 Winter Olympics
Cross-country skiers at the 2010 Winter Olympics
Cross-country skiers at the 2014 Winter Olympics
Cross-country skiers at the 2018 Winter Olympics
Olympic cross-country skiers of Kazakhstan
Asian Games medalists in cross-country skiing
Cross-country skiers at the 1999 Asian Winter Games
Cross-country skiers at the 2007 Asian Winter Games
Cross-country skiers at the 2011 Asian Winter Games
Cross-country skiers at the 2017 Asian Winter Games
Asian Games gold medalists for Kazakhstan
Asian Games silver medalists for Kazakhstan
Asian Games bronze medalists for Kazakhstan
Medalists at the 1999 Asian Winter Games
Medalists at the 2007 Asian Winter Games
Medalists at the 2011 Asian Winter Games
Medalists at the 2017 Asian Winter Games
Universiade medalists in cross-country skiing
Universiade silver medalists for Kazakhstan
Cross-country skiers at the 2007 Winter Universiade